Amandus Theodor Schibsted (5 May 1849 in Oslo, – 7 May 1913) was the owner and chief editor of Aftenposten. He inherited the news paper from his father, Christian Schibsted, in 1879, but worked as a journalist in the same news paper from 1871. During his leadership the news paper developed to be Norway's leading and most widespread conservative daily. He gained distinction through well-organised, quick and reliable news service.

When Amandus died in 1913, his wife Susane Adolphine Cathrine Schibsted (1849–1933) took over the ownership in the newspaper.

Amandus Schibsted is buried at Vår Frelsers gravlund in Oslo.

References

 Arbeidernes Leksikon
 Amandus Schibsted in Store Norske Leksikon
 Amandus Schibsted in Norsk Biografisk Leksikon

Norwegian newspaper editors
Norwegian businesspeople
Writers from Oslo
1849 births
1913 deaths
Burials at the Cemetery of Our Saviour
Aftenposten editors